Valambal also known as Maniammal as an Indian social activist who fought against capitalism in Thanjavur district.

Valambal was born in a Brahmin family of Thanjavur district. Married at a very young age, Valambal lost her husband when young. Valambal, however, defied tradition by refusing to wear a white saree or to tonsure her head.

Valambal cut her hair short and dressed like a young man. She, then, led a peasant insurrection against oppressive landlords of the Cauvery Delta. She was also partly responsible for the impressive performance of the Communist Party of India in the Thanjavur region.

References
  

Activists from Tamil Nadu
People from Thanjavur district
Indian women activists